The 2008 W-League Season was the league's 14th.  The regular season began on May 10, 2008, and ended on July 20.

Pali Blues finished the season as national champions, beating FC Indiana 2-1 in the W-League Championship game in Virginia Beach, Virginia on 2 August 2008.

The Pali Blues also finished with the best regular season record in the league, winning all 12 of their matches, and finishing with a +35 goal difference.

Atlanta Silverbacks Women's striker Sarah Steinmann was the league's top scorer, with 19 goals. FC Indiana's Laura Del Rio led the league with 13 assists, while Pali Blues goalkeeper Valerie Henderson enjoyed the best goalkeeping statistics, with a goals-against average of 0.142 per game, and posting 6 shutouts.

Changes from 2007 season
Nine teams were added for the season:

Three teams folded after the 2007 season: Mile High Edge, and San Diego Sunwaves. Cocoa Expos Women left the league for the WPSL.

Standings
Orange indicates W-League title and bye into W-League semifinals.
Blue indicates division title clinched
Green indicates playoff berth clinched

Central Conference

Midwest Division

Northern Division

Eastern Conference

Atlantic Division

Northeast Division

Western Conference

Playoffs

Format
Five teams each from the Central and Eastern Conferences, and two from the Western Conference, qualify for the playoffs.

In the Central Conference, the second and third place teams from the Northern Division play a one-leg playoff with the winner advancing to the Conference Semifinals, where they will play the Midwest Division champion.  The other semifinal will have the second place team from the Midwest Division playing the Northern Division champion.

In the Eastern Conference, the second and third place teams from the Northeast Division play a one-leg playoff with the winner advancing to play the Atlantic Division champion.  The other semifinal will have the second place team from the Atlantic Division playing the Northeast Division champion.

The two teams in the Western Conference will play each other to advance to the W-League Semifinals.

The Regular Season champion, Pali Blues, receive a bye into the W-League semifinals, with the second and third place teams from the Western Conference receiving playoff berths.

Conference Brackets
Central Conference

Eastern Conference

Western Conference

Pali captured the W-League regular season title and bye into W-League semifinals, enabling Vancouver to take their spot in the Conference Playoffs, and allowing Seattle to clinch a playoff berth.

W-League Championship Bracket

Divisional Rounds

Conference semifinals

Conference finals

W-League Semifinals

W-League Third-Place Game

W-League Finals

References

External links
  USL historical stats

USL W-League (1995–2015) seasons
Women
1
W